The women's 200 metres at the 2010 World Junior Championships in Athletics was held at the Moncton 2010 Stadium on 22 & 23 July.

Medalists

Records
Prior to the competition, the existing world junior and championship records were as follows.

No new records were established during the competition.

Results

Final
23 July
Wind: -0.5 m/s

Key: PB = Personal best

Semifinals
22 July

Semifinal 1
Wind: +1.3 m/s

Semifinal 2
Wind: +1.8 m/s

Semifinal 3
Wind: +1.6 m/s

Heats
22 July

Heat 1
Wind: +2.0 m/s

Heat 2
Wind: +0.2 m/s

Heat 3
Wind: +0.5 m/s

Heat 4
Wind: +0.7 m/s

Heat 5
Wind: +0.8 m/s

Heat 6
Wind: +0.5 m/s

Participation
According to an unofficial count, 40 athletes from 28 countries participated in the event.

References

External links
2010 World Junior Championships - Women's 200 metres (heats). IAAF. Retrieved on 2010-07-23.
2010 World Junior Championships - Women's 200 metres (semifinals). IAAF. Retrieved on 2010-07-23.
2010 World Junior Championships - Women's 200 metres (final). IAAF. Retrieved on 2010-07-23.
13th IAAF World Junior Championships Facts & Figures. IAAF. Retrieved on 2010-07-23.

200 metres
200 metres at the World Athletics U20 Championships
2010 in women's athletics